Zakham is a 1989 Indian Hindi-language feature film directed by Irfaan Khan for Disha Films, starring Shatrughan Sinha, Chunky Pandey, Neelam, Madhavi in lead roles. Bappi Lahiri composed the music for the film.

Cast
Shatrughan Sinha as Arjun
Chunky Pandey as Vijay
Neelam as Aarti
Madhavi as Asha
Bindu as Mary
Anupam Kher as Durjan
Om Shivpuri as Jagat

Soundtrack

References

External links
 

1989 films
1980s Hindi-language films
Indian action drama films
Films scored by Bappi Lahiri
1980s action drama films